Raghukul Reet Sada Chali Aayi is an Indian television series based on old Indian traditions (especially from the Raghukul period), cultures, and values, which revolves around the personal relationships among people in contemporary India. It premiered on 22 November 2008, and has starred Rajesh Khanna, Dinesh Kaushik, Jaya Bhattacharya and Shresth Kumar.

Cast
Rajesh Khanna
Dinesh Kaushik
Jaya Bhattacharya
Shresth Kumar
Sonal Udeshi

References

DD National original programming
Indian drama television series
Indian television series
2008 Indian television series debuts
2009 Indian television series endings